Martin Ryan (28 August 1923 – 13 January 2003) was an English professional rugby league footballer who played in the 1940s and 1950s.
He also made five guest appearances for St Helens (Heritage № 583) in 1943, plus one appearance for Leigh (Heritage № 643) in 1955. 

Ryan is credited with redefining the role of fullback from being a purely defensive role to one requiring counter-attacking skills.

Playing career

Club career
His last try for Wigan was scored during the  13–6 victory over Bradford Northern in the Championship Final during the 1951–52 season at Leeds Road, Huddersfield on Saturday 10 May 1952. His 300th and last match was the 2–15 defeat by Workington Town at Borough Park, Workington on Saturday 20 September 1952.

In the early part of his career Ryan played mostly at centre but from 1945 onwards played primarily at fullback.

Ryan appeared in five consecutive Lancashire Cup finals between 1946 and 1950, appearing on the winning side in four.  The only defeat was the first, a 3–7 defeat by Widnes in the 1945–46 Final during the at Wilderspool Stadium, Warrington on Saturday 27 October 1945.  The next four were victories; 9–3 over Belle Vue Rangers in the 1946–47 final  at Station Road, Swinton on Saturday 26 October 1946, a 10–7 victory over Belle Vue Rangers in the 1947–48 Final at Wilderspool Stadium, Warrington on Saturday 1 November 1947, a 14–8 victory over Warrington in the 1948–49 Final  at Station Road, Swinton on Saturday 13 November 1948, and a 20–7 victory over Leigh in the 1949–50 Final during the 1949–50 season at Wilderspool on Saturday 29 October 1949.

Championship success came in the 1943–44 season where Ryan, playing out of position at  played in both legs of the final against Dewsbury. A 13–9 victory at Central Park, Wigan on Saturday 13 May 1944 was followed by a 12–5 win at  Crown Flatt, Dewsbury on Saturday 20 May 1944. 

A Challenge Cup medal had to wait until 1948 when Ryan played  in Wigan's 8–3 victory over Bradford Northern in the 1947–48 Challenge Cup Final at Wembley Stadium, London on Saturday 1 May 1948.

A shoulder injury ended Ryan's playing career when aged only 30 but he remained on Wigan's books until January 1955 when the club placed him on the transfer list for a fee of £500.  He signed for Leigh the same month, Wigan receiving half the desired fee - £250. Ryan made his one and only appearance for Leigh in February 1955 in a Challenge Cup match against Doncaster before the recurrence of the shoulder injury forced a permanent retirement.  Ryan returned to Wigan as a director of the club in later years.  Outside of rugby league Ryan worked in the brewing industry for the Burtonwood Brewery.

International honours

Ryan was selected to tour Australia and New Zealand as part of the 1946 Great Britain Lions tour squad but only played in four non-test games before a hernia and subsequent surgery ruled him out of the rest of the tour.  His first cap came against  in 1947 as was followed by two caps against  in 1948 and a final cap against Australia in 1950.

Relatives
Ryan's younger brother Andrew played for Warrington during the 1949–50 season.

References

External links
Statistics at wigan.rlfans.com

1923 births
2003 deaths
England national rugby league team players
English rugby league players
Great Britain national rugby league team players
Leigh Leopards players
Place of birth missing
Place of death missing
Rugby league centres
Rugby league five-eighths
Rugby league fullbacks
Rugby league halfbacks
St Helens R.F.C. players
Wigan Warriors players